Dylan Steenbergen (born July 24, 1987) is a former professional Canadian football offensive lineman who played for the Montreal Alouettes and Edmonton Eskimos of the Canadian Football League (CFL).

He was drafted by the Montreal Alouettes in the first round of the 2009 CFL Draft with the seventh overall pick. He played CIS football for the Calgary Dinos.

References

External links
Edmonton Eskimos bio

1987 births
Living people
Calgary Dinos football players
Canadian football offensive linemen
Edmonton Elks players
Montreal Alouettes players
Players of Canadian football from Alberta
Sportspeople from Lethbridge